David Paul Harrison (born 8 July 1972 in St Asaph, North Wales) is a former flat racing jockey.

Harrison rode his first winner on a horse called Majestic Image at Southwell Racecourse on St David's Day, 1 March 1991. He went on to become the British flat racing Champion Apprentice jockey in 1992, with 56 winners, also winning the Lester Award for 'Apprentice Jockey of the Year'.

During his 11 years in racing, his major wins included the Royal Hunt Cup for Queen Elizabeth II at Royal Ascot (Colour Sergeant) along with victories in the Hong Kong Derby (Holy Grail) and Irish St. Leger (Arctic Owl).

Other notable winners include Mongol Warrior, trained by Lord Huntingdon which became the first British trained winner of the Swiss Derby and Single Empire, trained by Peter Chapple-Hyam, winner of the Derby Italiano. He also rode many winners as stable jockey to trainers James Fanshawe and Brian Kan.

Harrison's career ended prematurely, after he damaged his spinal cord when he fell from the racehorse, My Chief, in a race at Sha Tin Racecourse, Hong Kong, on 30 May 2001. My Chief clipped the heels of another horse and took a heavy fall.

After his accident, Harrison relocated to Andalucia and became an agent for other jockeys.

References

Welsh jockeys
1972 births
Living people
Sportspeople from St Asaph

Lester Award winners
British Champion apprentice jockeys